Ian Denzil Greaves (26 May 1932 – 2 January 2009) was an English football player and manager. He was born in Crompton, Lancashire. He won a League Championship medal and an FA Cup runners-up medal while playing full-back for Manchester United between 1953 and 1960. He was not with the United team when eight of their players died in the Munich air disaster on 6 February 1958, as he was ruled out by injury. He was the first player to occupy the left-back position at United after the death of captain Roger Byrne at Munich.

After leaving United in 1960, he later played for Lincoln City and Oldham Athletic.

Managerial career

He took over the reins at Huddersfield Town in 1968 and led them to the Football League Second Division championship in 1969–1970.

After leaving Huddersfield in the summer of 1974 he joined Bolton Wanderers as assistant to Jimmy Armfield and when Armfield took over the vacant manager's position at Leeds United he was promoted to the top job, taking over a squad that included Sam Allardyce and Peter Reid. In his time there he again won promotion to the top division and also reached the League Cup semi-final while the club were still in the second division. Unfortunately, Bolton's First Division performance was disappointing and Greaves was sacked on 28 January 1980.

An 18-month spell at Oxford United followed, before he took charge of First Division side Wolverhampton Wanderers in February 1982. However, the team were in the relegation zone at the time of his appointment and he was unable to prevent the drop, winning just five of his 20 games. Bankruptcy struck in the summer and saw a new regime eventually take control who opted to replace Greaves with Graham Hawkins.

Greaves' final managerial job was in the lower leagues at Mansfield Town where he spent six years, guiding the Stags to promotion in 1985–86, and winning the Associate Members' Cup at Wembley in 1987. They were still secure in the Third Division when he departed on 6 February 1989.

He died in Ainsworth, Greater Manchester, on 2 January 2009, aged 76.

Managerial statistics
All competitive league games (league and domestic cup) and international matches (including friendlies) are included.

References

1932 births
2009 deaths
People from Shaw and Crompton
English Football League players
Manchester United F.C. players
Lincoln City F.C. players
Oldham Athletic A.F.C. players
Huddersfield Town A.F.C. managers
Bolton Wanderers F.C. managers
Oxford United F.C. managers
Wolverhampton Wanderers F.C. managers
Mansfield Town F.C. managers
English football managers
Footballers from Oldham
Huddersfield Town A.F.C. non-playing staff
Association football fullbacks
English footballers
FA Cup Final players